Lorenzo Soares Fonseca (born 17 November 1998) is a professional footballer who plays as a defender for Portuguese club Académica de Coimbra. Born in the Netherlands, Fonseca represents the Cape Verde national football team.

Club career
Fonseca made his professional debut with Sparta Rotterdam in a 2–2 Eerste Divisie tie with Jong Ajax on 26 April 2019. His contract with Sparta Rotterdam was terminated on 1 February 2021.

Fonseca signed for FC Den Bosch on a contract until the end of the season on 2 February 2021.

On 9 July 2021, he joined Académica de Coimbra in Portugal.

International career
Born in the Netherlands, Fonseca is of Cape Verdean descent. He debuted for the Cape Verde national football team in a friendly 2–1 win over Togo on 10 October 2019.

References

External links
 
 
 

1998 births
Living people
Footballers from Rotterdam
Cape Verdean footballers
Cape Verde international footballers
Dutch footballers
Dutch sportspeople of Cape Verdean descent
Association football defenders
Sparta Rotterdam players
FC Den Bosch players
Associação Académica de Coimbra – O.A.F. players
Eerste Divisie players
Tweede Divisie players
Liga Portugal 2 players
Cape Verdean expatriate footballers
Expatriate footballers in Portugal
Cape Verdean expatriate sportspeople in Portugal